George Pérez may refer to:

George Pérez (1954-2022), Puerto Rican-American writer and illustrator of comic books
George Perez (actor) (born 1972), American actor and acting trainer
 George Perez (baseball) (born 1937), former Major League Baseball pitcher